The 1994 Copa CONMEBOL Finals were the two-legged series that decided the winner of 1994 Copa CONMEBOL, the 3rd. edition of this international competition. The finals were contested by Brazilian club São Paulo and Uruguayan club Peñarol.

The first leg was held in Estádio do Morumbi in the city of São Paulo, where the local team easily defeated Peñarol 6–1. In the second leg, held in Estadio Centenario in Montevideo, Peñarol beat São Paulo 3–0. As a result, both teams were tied on points, but São Paulo won 6–4 on goal difference to claim their first title in the competition.

Qualified teams

Venues

Route to the final

Note: In all results below, the score of the finalist is given first.

Match details

First leg

Second leg

References 

Copa CONMEBOL Finals
c
c
1994 in South American football
1994 in Uruguayan football
1994 in Brazilian football